Craig Robert Shakespeare (born 26 October 1963) is an English football coach and former player who was most recently the  assistant manager of Norwich City.

A midfielder, he began his playing career with Walsall, where he made over 350 appearances. After a brief spell with Sheffield Wednesday, he also made over 100 appearances for both West Bromwich Albion and Grimsby Town.

As a coach, Shakespeare has previously worked at West Bromwich Albion, Leicester City and Hull City. He was briefly caretaker manager at West Brom in 2006 and took a similar role at Leicester in February 2017 before he was appointed manager in March. He was appointed permanent manager of Leicester City on 8 June 2017 after signing a 3-year deal. He has since served as assistant manager for Everton, Watford, Aston Villa and the England national team.

Playing career
In his playing days he was an attacking midfielder; he favoured his left foot and his preferred position was on the left side of midfield. He signed as an apprentice at Walsall in September 1979, turning professional in November 1981. Shakespeare rates his goal in a 2–2 League Cup draw against Chelsea in October 1984 as the best of his career. In 1987–88 he helped Walsall to win promotion to Division Two via the playoffs, an achievement which he has since described as his greatest in football. He played well over 350 games for the Saddlers, scoring 59 goals, and in 1989 he moved to Sheffield Wednesday, then in the First Division, for a fee of £300,000.

He spent less than a year at Hillsborough, before moving to West Bromwich Albion for £275,000. He stayed at Albion for over three years, making 128 appearances in total and becoming the team's first choice penalty taker. He scored twice from the penalty spot in Albion's first ever game in the Third Division, a 6–3 victory over Exeter City in August 1991.

Albion were promoted in 1993, but Shakespeare moved to Grimsby Town, rejoining Alan Buckley under whom he had played at Walsall. He later moved on to Scunthorpe United, and also played for three non-league clubs before retiring.

Coaching career
In 1999, he re-joined West Brom as Football in the Community Officer. In this role, he was responsible for promoting football at grass roots level in the local community. He later took up the post of academy coach, then in 2006 became Reserve Team Coach. In October 2006, following the departure of Bryan Robson and then his assistant Nigel Pearson (who had been caretaker manager for a period of four weeks), Shakespeare was given charge of the first team for one game pending the arrival of Tony Mowbray. The game was away to Crystal Palace; Albion won 2–0.

Shakespeare left Albion in June 2008 to become Pearson's assistant manager at Leicester City, a move that was confirmed on 1 July. As well as having worked together on the West Bromwich Albion coaching staff, the two had also played together at Sheffield Wednesday. Shakespeare once said that Pearson was the best captain he had ever played under.

Shakespeare then followed Pearson to Hull City, which lasted until 2011.

He then followed Pearson back to Leicester City when the latter was reappointed manager there in November 2011. Following Pearson's sacking in July 2015, Shakespeare remained as assistant manager to incoming manager Claudio Ranieri. The club subsequently being crowned English champions in 2015-16

When Sam Allardyce was made England manager in 2016 Shakespeare took on a coaching position alongside his Leicester job, but left when Allardyce resigned after just one match.

When Ranieri was sacked on 23 February 2017, Shakespeare took over as caretaker manager. His first game in charge was a 3–1 victory over Liverpool in the Premier League. On 12 March, he was named as the new manager of Leicester City. On 18 March, Shakespeare became the first Premier League manager ever to achieve 3 goals per game in his first three matches in charge. Then on 1 April, he became the only English manager to win his first four league matches.

On 8 June, Shakespeare signed a 3-year deal to be the permanent manager for Leicester City. On 17 October 2017, he was fired after poor performances left the club in the bottom three of the Premier League.

On 1 December 2017, Shakespeare was appointed first team coach at Everton following the appointment of Sam Allardyce as manager the previous day. On 16 May 2018, Allardyce and his backroom staff, including Shakespeare, were sacked by Everton.

On 6 December 2019, Shakespeare was reunited with Nigel Pearson once again, as he was named as assistant manager at Watford. He remained in this role until 19 July 2020, when Pearson and his backroom staff were sacked, despite there only being two games left in the season, and Watford being out of the relegation zone at that point. Watford went on to lose both their remaining games, and suffer relegation from the Premier League.

On 7 August 2020, Shakespeare was appointed as assistant head coach to former Walsall teammate Dean Smith at Aston Villa, the team he supported growing up. On 8 November 2021, Shakespeare parted company with Aston Villa, the day after Smith left the club. On 15 November 2021, Shakespeare was appointed assistant head coach at Norwich City, again under Dean Smith who became the club's new head coach.

Managerial statistics

Honours
Walsall
Third Division play-off winner: 1988

References

External links

1963 births
Living people
Footballers from Birmingham, West Midlands
English footballers
Association football midfielders
Walsall F.C. players
Sheffield Wednesday F.C. players
West Bromwich Albion F.C. players
Grimsby Town F.C. players
Scunthorpe United F.C. players
Telford United F.C. players
Hednesford Town F.C. players
English Football League players
National League (English football) players
English football managers
Leicester City F.C. managers
West Bromwich Albion F.C. managers
English Football League managers
Premier League managers
West Bromwich Albion F.C. non-playing staff
Leicester City F.C. non-playing staff
Hull City A.F.C. non-playing staff
Everton F.C. non-playing staff
Watford F.C. non-playing staff
Aston Villa F.C. non-playing staff
Norwich City F.C. non-playing staff
Association football coaches